Vareion Deshay "Shay" Hodge (born October 18, 1987) is a gridiron football wide receiver who is currently a free agent. He was signed by the Washington Redskins as an undrafted free agent in 2010. He played college football at Ole Miss.

College career
Hodge played for the Ole Miss Rebels from 2006 to 2009.

Professional career

Washington Redskins
Hodge originally signed a free-agent contract with the San Francisco 49ers but was released during rookie camp. Following his release, he was immediately offered a spot with the Washington Redskins and signed a contract with them. He was waived during final cuts.

Cincinnati Bengals
Hodge was signed to the Cincinnati Bengals practice squad on September 8, 2010.

Georgia Force
Hodge has signed with the Georgia Force of the Arena Football League for 2012.

Kansas City Command
Hodge was traded to the Kansas City Command on March 5, 2012, along with John Gianninoto

New Orleans VooDoo
Hodge signed with the New Orleans VooDoo for the 2013 season.

Jacksonville Sharks
On October 16, 2015, Hodge was assigned to the Jacksonville Sharks. On June 20, 2016, Hodge was placed on reassignment.

Saskatchewan Roughriders
Hodge signed with the Saskatchewan Roughriders on January 29, 2016. He was released on June 14, 2016.

References

1987 births
Living people
Players of American football from Mississippi
American football wide receivers
Ole Miss Rebels football players
Washington Redskins players
Cincinnati Bengals players
Georgia Force players
Kansas City Command players
New Orleans VooDoo players
Jacksonville Sharks players
People from Morton, Mississippi